Sven Peek, best known as Bobby Peek, is an environmentalist and activist from Durban, South Africa. He was awarded the Goldman Environmental Prize in 1998, for his efforts on improvement of pollution problems in the region of South Durban.

Bobby Peek founded and acts as the director of Groundwork, an NGO dedicated to environmental justice service and developmental organization working primarily in South Africa.

References 

Year of birth missing (living people)
Living people
South African environmentalists
People from Durban
Goldman Environmental Prize awardees